The 2021 Presidential Tour of Turkey was a road cycling stage race that took place between 11 and 18 April 2021 in Turkey. It was the 56th edition of the Presidential Tour of Turkey. The race has previously been a part of the UCI World Tour up until 2019, but it was relegated in 2020. This edition was the race's first as a 2.Pro event on the UCI ProSeries and UCI Europe Tour calendars since its demotion, with the 2020 edition having been cancelled due to the COVID-19 pandemic.

Teams 
Three UCI WorldTeams, fourteen UCI ProTeams and eight UCI Continental teams participated in the race. UCI ProTeam  was originally invited to participate, but they imposed a self-suspension on racing after one of their riders received a positive anti-doping test. From the 171 riders that started the race, 139 finished.

UCI WorldTeams

 
 
 

UCI ProTeams

 
 
 
 
 
 
 
 
 
 
 
 
 
 
 

UCI Continental Teams

Route 
The 2021 edition includes eight stages, up from six in 2019, covering  over eight days.

Stages

Stage 1 
11 April 2021 — Nevşehir to Ürgüp,  Konya to Konya,

Stage 2 
12 April 2021 — Konya to Konya,

Stage 3 
13 April 2021 — Beyşehir to Alanya,

Stage 4 
14 April 2021 — Alanya to Kemer,

Stage 5 
15 April 2021 — Kemer to Elmalı,

Stage 6 
16 April 2021 — Fethiye to Marmaris,

Stage 7 
17 April 2021 — Marmaris to Turgutreis,

Stage 8 
18 April 2021 — Bodrum to Kuşadası,

Classification leadership table 

 On stage 2, Kristoffer Halvorsen, who was second in the points classification, wore the green jersey, because first-placed Arvid de Kleijn wore the turquoise jersey as the leader of the general classification. Arvid de Kleijn on stage 3 and Jasper Philipsen on stages 4 and 5 wore the green jersey on behalf of Mark Cavendish for the same reason.

Final classification standings

General classification

Points classification

Mountains classification

Turkish Beauties Sprints classification

Team classification

References

Sources

Notes

External links 

2021
Presidential Tour of Turkey
Presidential Tour of Turkey
Presidential Tour of Turkey
Presidential Tour of Turkey